The Crystal Party (Swedish: Kristall Parti) is a Finnish party that was registered in 2021. The founding meeting of the association that would become the Crystal Party was held on 6 December 2013 by five people. The association was registered in April 2014. The association started gathering signatures in order to register as a political party and reached the required 5000 signatures in March 2021.

Ideology 
The party opposes vaccine mandates and espouses COVID-19 conspiracy theories. Its chairperson, Juho Lyytikäinen, has called Bill Gates "world's most influential doctor" and claims that the pandemic is orchestrated by the World Health Organization. The party also believes that "Western" medicine is not enough to answer all the questions regarding modern health problems. Instead, it supports "alternative medicine" like homeopathy and advocates for official recognition of such treatments.

Electoral success 
In 2020, a city councillor in Polvijärvi was expelled from the Social Democratic Party after denying the Holocaust. She later founded a councillor group for the Crystal Party and thus became the party's first and so far only municipal councillor.

The Crystal Party took part in its first elections during the 2021 municipal elections. The party won 6,285 votes (0.3% of overall share) at the national level. None of its candidates were elected. One of the best-known candidates of the party was Maria Nordin, a controversial wellness coach.

References

External links 
  

Political parties in Finland
Political parties established in 2021
Anti-vaccination organizations
2021 establishments in Finland